Jaʿfar ibn ʿAlī ibn Abī Ṭālib was a son of Ali and Umm al-Banin. He was named by Ali after the latter's brother, Ja'far ibn Abi Talib. The younger Ja'far was one of the companions of Husayn in the Battle of Karbala, where he was martyred on Ashura alongside his brothers Abbas, Abdullah and Uthman.

See also
 Descendants of Ali ibn Abi Talib
 Ashura
 Tasu'a
 Sermon of Ali ibn Husayn in Damascus
 Ziyarat Ashura
 Battle of Karbala
 Abbas ibn Ali
 Shia view of Ali

References 

People killed at the Battle of Karbala
Children of Rashidun caliphs
Children of Ali